Kseniia Andreyevna Akhanteva (born 7 October 2002) is a Russian pair skater. With her former partner, Valerii Kolesov,  she is the 2020 World Junior silver medalist, the 2020 Russian Junior National silver medalist and 2019–20 Junior Grand Prix Final bronze medalist.

Career

Early years 
Akhanteva began learning to skate in 2006. She began competing with her first pair skating partner, Valerii Kolesov, in 2014.

2016–2017 season 
Coached by Vasilii Velikov in Saint Petersburg, Akhanteva/Kolesov made their international debut in late August 2016, placing seventh at the Junior Grand Prix (JGP) competition in Ostrava, Czech Republic. In November, they won the junior silver medal at the Volvo Open Cup, finishing second behind their teammates Nika Osipova / Aleksandr Galiamov.

2017–2018 season 
In September, Akhanteva/Kolesov placed sixth at the 2017 JGP competition in Riga, Latvia. The pair had the same final result at the 2018 Russian Junior Championships, which took place in January in Saransk. In April, they took silver at the Russian Youth Championships – Elder Age, where they finished second to Amina Atakhanova / Nikita Volodin and ahead of Apollinariia Panfilova / Dmitry Rylov.

2018–2019 season 
Coached by Ludmila Velikova, Nikolai Velikov and Vasilii Velikov, Akhanteva/Kolesov started their season in August on the 2018 JGP series. Ranked second in the short and third in the free, they won the bronze medal in Bratislava, Slovakia, contributing to a Russian sweep of the pairs' podium. Akhanteva/Kolesov were more than 11 points behind the champions, their training partners Anastasia Mishina / Aleksandr Galiamov, but lost to the silver medalists, Apollinariia Panfilova / Dmitry Rylov, by a margin of only 0.13 points. In September, they outscored their teammates and training partners, Polina Kostiukovich / Dmitrii Ialin, by about four points for gold at the JGP in Ostrava, Czech Republic, where they were second in the short program and first in the free skate. With these results they have qualified to the 2018–2019 Junior Grand Prix Final, where they placed fourth overall. Akhanteva/Kolesov went on to compete at 2019 Russian Nationals, their first ever senior competition, and finished tenth there. Unfortunately they had to withdraw from the junior event after Akhanteva seriously injured her leg.

2019–2020 season 

Akhanteva/Kolesov started their season with a silver medal at the 2019 Junior Grand Prix competition in Lake Placid, United States. Ranked second in the short and second in the free, they finished 15 points behind the gold medalists Apollinariia Panfilova / Dmitry Rylov, in part due to costly jumping errors in both programs. Two weeks later Akhanteva/Kolesov took the gold at JGP Chelyabinsk, Russia. Ranked first in the short program and first in the free skate, they finished eight points ahead of silver medalists Iuliia Artemeva / Mikhail Nazarychev, and led a Russian sweep of the pairs' podium at their home JGP. At this event Akhanteva/Kolesov became the first junior pairs team to break 40 TES in the short program.  Their results qualified them to the 2019–20 Junior Grand Prix Final in Torino, where they won the bronze medal.

Competing at the 2020 Russian Championships at the senior level, they placed tenth.  Having then won the silver medal at the junior championships, they were named to Russia's team for the 2020 World Junior Championships.  Second in the short program with a clean skate, Kolesov nevertheless said he felt it was not their best performance and stated their goal was to achieve a season's best result in the free.  In that segment, Akhanteva fell on both side-by-side jump attempts and put a foot and hand down on one of their two throw jumps, but they nevertheless remained in second place and won the silver medal overall due to errors by third- and fourth-place finishers Artemeva/Nazarychev and Hocke/Kunkel.  Kolesov acknowledged "the performance was bad today. I don't know the reason, but the result is good, because the short program was good."

2020–2021 season 
Competing on the domestic Cup of Russia series, Akhanteva/Kolesov won the silver medal at the first stage in Syzran. They made their Grand Prix debut at the 2020 Rostelecom Cup, finishing sixth among the seven teams. They withdrew from the 2021 Russian Championships at the senior level, and then won the junior silver medal later in the season.

2021–2022 season 
With the resumption of the Junior Grand Prix, Akhanteva/Kolesov competed at the 2021 JPG Slovakia.  They placed second in the short program, but multiple falls in the free skate dropped them to fourth overall.

On April 18, it was announced that Akhanteva and Kolesov had split.

Programs

With Kolesov

Competitive highlights 
GP: Grand Prix; JGP: Junior Grand Prix

With Kolesov

Detailed results 
Small medals for short and free programs awarded only at ISU Championships.

With Kolesov

Senior

Junior

References

External links 

 

2002 births
Russian female pair skaters
Living people
Sportspeople from Vladivostok
World Junior Figure Skating Championships medalists